Liam Hamilton (8 September 1928 – 29 November 2000) was an Irish judge and barrister who served as Chief Justice of Ireland and a Judge of the Supreme Court from 1994 to 2000, President of the High Court from 1985 to 1994 and a Judge of the High Court from 1974 to 1994.

Early life
He was born in Mitchelstown, County Cork to Richard Hamilton and Mary Ellen Hamilton (née Lyons). He was educated at C.B.S. Mitchelstown, University College Dublin and King's Inns. He initially worked as a civil servant and was called to the Bar in 1956 and to the Inner Bar in 1968.

Career
He acted for Neil Blaney when Blaney and Charles Haughey were charged with conspiracy to import arms in 1970. He was a member of the Labour Party and acted as its legal advisor. After the Labour Party formed a coalition government with Fine Gael in 1973, he was appointed to the High Court. He was regarded as sociable and visited former legal colleagues after becoming a judge. In 1985, on the nomination of the Labour Party, he was appointed President of the High Court, where he was successful in reforming procedures and clearing a backlog of cases.

He was the sole member of a tribunal of inquiry established by the government in 1991 to investigate allegations of illegal activity, fraud and malpractice in the beef processing industry, known as the Beef Tribunal, which sat from 1991 to 1994. Shortly after the report of the tribunal, he was nominated as Chief Justice. In 1999 he was asked by Minister for Justice  John O'Donoghue to investigate the Philip Sheedy Affair.

On retirement as Chief Justice in 2000, he was appointed to the enquiry into the 1974 Dublin, Monaghan and Dundalk bombings, but stepped down on health grounds. He died on 29 November 2000.

See also
 Hamilton, Liam (William Joseph Lyons) at the Dictionary of Irish Biography

References

1928 births
2000 deaths
People from County Cork
Chief justices of Ireland
Alumni of University College Dublin
Presidents of the High Court (Ireland)
Alumni of King's Inns